Anthropological criminology (sometimes referred to as criminal anthropology, literally a combination of the study of the human species and the study of criminals) is a field of offender profiling, based on perceived links between the nature of a crime and the personality or physical appearance of the offender. Although similar to physiognomy and phrenology, the term "criminal anthropology" is generally reserved for the works of the Italian school of criminology of the late 19th century (Cesare Lombroso, Enrico Ferri, Raffaele Garofalo and Lorenzo Tenchini). Lombroso thought that criminals were born with detectable inferior physiological differences. He popularized the notion of "born criminal" and thought that criminality was a case of atavism or hereditary disposition. His central idea was to locate crime completely within the individual and divorce it from surrounding social conditions and structures. A founder of the Positivist school of criminology, Lombroso opposed the social positivism developed by the Chicago school and environmental criminology.

History

Italian school

Mugshot and fingerprinting 

On the other hand, Alphonse Bertillon (1853–1914) created a mugshot identification system for criminals prior to the invention of fingerprinting. Hans Gross (1847–1915), leading worker in the field of criminology was also involved in the development of the theory.<ref name="here">Anthropological Criminology, North Carolina Wesleyan College, retrieved from here on March 10, 2007 </ref>

 Social Darwinism 
The theory of anthropological criminology was influenced heavily by the ideas of Charles Darwin (1809–1882). However, the influences came mainly from philosophy derived from Darwin's theory of evolution, specifically that some species were morally superior to others. This idea was in fact spawned by social Darwinism but nevertheless formed a critical part of anthropological criminology. The work of Cesare Lombroso was continued by social Darwinists in the United States between 1881 and 1911.

Theory
In the 19th century, Cesare Lombroso and his followers performed autopsies on criminals and declared that they had discovered similarities between the physiologies of the bodies and those of "primitive humans" such as monkeys and apes. Most of these similarities involved receding foreheads, height, head shape, and size; Lombroso postulated the theory of the born criminal based on these physical characteristics. Moreover, he also declared that the female offender was worse than the male, as they had distinct masculine characteristics.

Lombroso outlined 14 physiognomic characteristics which he and his followers believed to be common in all criminals, some of which were (but are not limited to): unusually short or tall height; small head, but large face; fleshy lips, but thin upper lip; protuberances (bumps) on head, in back of head and around ear; wrinkles on forehead and face; large sinus cavities or bumpy face; tattoos on body; receding hairline; bumps on head, particularly above left ear; large incisors; bushy eyebrows, tending to meet across nose; large eye sockets, but deep-set eyes; beaked or flat nose; strong jaw line; small and sloping forehead; small or weak chin; thin neck; sloping shoulders, but large chest; large, protruding ears; long arms; high cheek bones; pointy or snubbed fingers or toes.

Lombroso published several works regarding his work, L'Uomo Delinquente, L'Homme Criminel (The Criminal Man), The Female Offender (original titled Criminal Woman, the Prostitute, and the Normal Woman) and Criminal Man, According to the Classification of Cesare Lombroso.

Rejection

During Lombroso's life, British scientist Charles Buckman Goring (1870–1919) was also working in the same area, and concluded that there were no noticeable physiological differences between law-abiding people and criminals. Maurice Parmelee, seen as the founder of modern criminology in America, also began to reject the theory of anthropological criminology in 1911, which led to its eventual withdrawal from the field of accepted criminological research. (Source?)

Modern times

Despite general rejection of Lombroso's theories, anthropological criminology still finds a place of sort in modern criminal profiling. Historically (particularly in the 1930s) criminal anthropology had been associated somewhat with eugenics as the idea of a physiological flaw in the human race was often associated with plans to remove such flaws. This was found particularly in America, with the American Eugenics Movement between 1907 and 1939, and the Anti-miscegenation laws, and also in Germany during the Third Reich where 250,000 mentally disabled Germans were killed.

Criminal anthropology, and the closely related study of Physiognomy, have also found their way into studies of social psychology and forensic psychology. Studies into the nature of twins also combines aspects of criminal anthropology, as some studies reveal that identical twins share a likelihood of criminal activities more so than non-identical twins. Lombroso's theories are also found in studies of Galvanic skin response and XYY chromosome syndrome.

See also

 Biosocial criminology
 Criminal psychology
 Criminology
 Pathognomy
 Personology
 Phrenology
 Physiognomy
 Racial bias in criminal news
 Scientific racism

References

Bibliography

 Garbarino, M. Sociocultural Theory in Anthropology'', (1977).
 Black, E. War Against the Weak: Eugenics and America's Campaign to Create a Master Race, (2003).

Anthropology
Criminology